The Midway Group is a geologic group in Tennessee, Arkansas, Mississippi, Louisiana, Texas and Alabama. It preserves fossils dating back to the Paleogene period.

See also

 List of fossiliferous stratigraphic units in Tennessee
 Paleontology in Tennessee

References
 

Geologic groups of Arkansas
Paleogene Arkansas
Geologic groups of Tennessee